Ophisternon is a genus of swamp eels found in fresh and brackish waters in South and Southeast Asia, New Guinea, Australia, Middle America and West Africa. Two species are blind cave-dwellers.

Species
There are currently six recognized species in this genus:

 Ophisternon aenigmaticum D. E. Rosen & Greenwood, 1976 (Obscure swamp eel)
 Ophisternon afrum (Boulenger, 1909) (Guinea swamp eel)
 Ophisternon bengalense McClelland, 1844 (Bengal eel)
 Ophisternon candidum (Mees, 1962) (Blind cave eel)
 Ophisternon gutturale (J. Richardson, 1845) (Australian swamp eel)
 Ophisternon infernale (C. L. Hubbs, 1938) (Blind swamp eel)

References

 
Synbranchidae
Ray-finned fish genera
Taxa named by John McClelland (doctor)
Taxonomy articles created by Polbot